In chemistry, 2,2,3,3-tetramethylsuccinic acid or 2,2,3,3-tetramethylbutane-1,4-dioic acid is a dicarboxylic acid with the formula , or HOOC-C(CH3)2-C(CH3)2-COOH.

It can be seen as derivative of succinic acid (butane-1,4-dioic acid) with two methyl groups replacing two hydrogen atoms on each of the central carbon atoms of the chain.

Synthesis and chemistry

The compound can also be obtained by thermal decomposition of 2,2,3,3-tetramethyl-4-one-glutaric acid with release of a carbon monoxide molecule.

On heating it forms a heterocyclic anhydride, 3,3,4,4-tetramethyltetrahydrofuran-2,5-dione, with loss of one molecule of water.

References

Dicarboxylic acids